GPK may refer to:

Kaaba Youth Movement (Gerakan Pemuda Kabah), youth wing of United Development Party
 East Glacier Park station, in Montana, United States
 Garbage Pail Kids, an animated television series and film
 Government Polytechnic, Karwar, in Karnataka, India
 Grange Park railway station, in London
 Grenzplankostenrechnung, a cost-accounting methodology 
 GPK, Australian musician; founder of the band GPKism